Italian Scots are people of Italian descent living in Scotland. These terms may refer to people who are born in Scotland and of Italian descent. It can also refer to people of mixed Scottish and Italian ancestry. A recent Italian voter census estimated that there are 70,000 to 100,000 people in Scotland of Italian descent or Italian nationals, which is up to 1.9% of the overall Scottish population.

Latest available figures from the 2011 UK Census show there were 6,048 people born in Italy living in Scotland. This was up from 4,936 in 2001 and 3,947 recorded in 1991. In 2016, Ronnie Convery, secretary of the Italian Scotland charitable organisation and director of communications at the Archdiocese of Glasgow, asserted that a completely new dimension was being added to the Scots-Italians community. He said, “There has been a brand new migration over the past two years, and the biggest one we have seen in 100 years."

Migration to Scotland from Italy has been predominantly from the provinces of Lucca and Frosinone. Additional provinces with fairly significant emigration to Scotland include Isernia, La Spezia, Pistoia, Parma, Latina, Massa-Carrara and Pordenone. The Scottish Italian community settled mostly in the Glasgow area, most of whom are of Tuscan origin. The smaller Italian community in and around Edinburgh is predominantly of Lazian origin.

History
Arguably the first people from Italy to reach Scotland were the Romans in and around 40AD, although the modern nations of Italy and Scotland did not exist at the time and of course the Roman Empire was a cosmopolitan institution, with some Roman Emperors from the Iberian Peninsula and North Africa. Still, at least some of the Romans in Scotland were probably from what is now Italy and their constructions in Scotland of the Antonine Wall and other, mostly military installations, provide some insight into the period. No Roman or Romano-Celtic identity appears to have existed in Scotland at this time and it was not until the end of the 19th century that any form of an Italian-Scots identity ever began to take shape.

Many Italian-Scots can trace their ancestry back to the 1890s where their forefathers escaped drought, famine and poverty in their homeland for a better life in Scotland; yet it was not until World War I that a sizeable population of Italian-Scots—over 4,000—began to emerge, with Glasgow hosting the third largest community in the United Kingdom. Since then, there has been a steady flow of migration between the two countries.

Italy and the fascist involvement in World War II brought many hardships on Italians settled in Scotland - many families were separated as adult males were interned. The family members that were left behind were forced to cope with mistrust and discrimination. Of those imprisoned many men found themselves held in Northern Ireland and the Isle of Man. A number of others were employed in Orkney, at Scapa Flow, to construct a barrier against Nazi U-boats. These men additionally constructed the Chapel of Lambholm from scrap metal and junk. Nowadays, this Chapel is one of Orkney's most popular tourist attractions.

Today, Italian Scots can be found working in all manner of professions. However, a large proportion of the community have plied their trade in the catering industry, working in the chip shops, ice-cream parlours, pizzerias and restaurants across Scotland.

In Edinburgh,The Italo-Scottish Research Cluster (ISRC) aims to study Italian immigration in Scotland and promote relations between Scotland and Italy.

Notable Italian Scots 

 John Amabile, interior designer
 Ronni Ancona, impressionist and actress
 Angus Barbieri, holds the Guinness World Record for the longest recorded fast at 382 days.
 Nicola Benedetti, violinist
 George Biagi, Rugby Player
 Romana D'Annunzio, television presenter
 Junior Campbell, musician and composer
 Gianni Capaldi, actor
 Lewis Capaldi (b. 1996), singer-songwriter and first cousin, twice removed of actor Peter Capaldi
 Peter Capaldi (b. 1958), actor and director, best-known for Malcolm Tucker in The Thick of It and the Twelfth Doctor in  Doctor Who 
 Emilio Coia, caricaturist
 Jack Coia, architect
 Paul Coia, television presenter
 Angela Constance, Scottish National Party MSP
 Mario Joseph Conti, emeritus Archbishop of Glasgow
 Nina Conti, actor, comedian, and ventriloquist
 Tom Conti, actor
 Adrienne Corri, actress
 Simon Danielli, rugby union player
 Nick De Luca, rugby union player
 Richard Demarco, art impresario
 Sophia Dussek, musician
 Paul di Giacomo, footballer
 Linda Fabiani, Scottish National Party MSP, and former Minister for Culture
 Charles Forte, hotelier
 Rocco Forte, hotelier
 Dario Franchitti, Racecar driver
 Marino Franchitti, Racecar driver
 Chris Fusaro, rugby player
 Armando Iannucci, writer and satirist
 Keira Lucchesi, actress
 Lou Macari, footballer and football manager
 Peter Marinello, footballer
 Oscar Marzaroli, photographer
 Dominic Matteo, footballer
 Kirsty Mitchell, actress
 Alberto Morrocco, artist
 Giovanni Moscardini, footballer
 Sir Anton Muscatelli, Principal and Vice-Chancellorof the University of Glasgow
 Daniela Nardini, actress
 Paolo Nutini, singer-songwriter
 Sir Eduardo Paolozzi, sculptor
 Carmen Pieraccini, actress
 Paul di Resta, Formula 1 racecar driver
 David Rizzio, private secretary of Mary, Queen of Scots
 Marcus Di Rollo, rugby player
 Carla Romano, TV journalist
 George Rossi, actor
 Ricky Sbragia, footballer
 Tom Sermanni, football coach
 Rachel Sermanni, singer-songwriter
 Sharleen Spiteri, singer-songwriter; guitarist; lead vocalist of the Scottish pop-rock band Texas
 Ken Stott, actor
 Philip Tartaglia, Archbishop of Glasgow
 Margaret (Maggie) Zavaroni, singer ; seamstress 
 Alexander Trocchi, writer
 Peter Vettese, musician
 Jack Vettriano, painter
 Charles Edward Stuart, Prince 
 Lena Zavaroni, singer

In popular culture

American Cousins – A film about an Italian Scots family and their Mafia associated American cousins.
Strictly Sinatra
Comfort and Joy – A film about a war between rival Italian ice cream companies in Glasgow.  The film is a spoof of American gangster movies.
Soft Top Hard Shoulder

See also 

 Italian migration to Britain
 Immigration to the United Kingdom
 Italian diaspora
 List of British Italians
 Italian Scot communities of Filignano and Cerasuolo

References 

Pieri, J. (2005) 'The Scots-Italians: Recollections of an Immigrant' The Mercat Press

 
Italian diaspora in the United Kingdom
Scots
Immigration to Scotland
Ethnic groups in Scotland